This timeline shows the periods of various architectural styles in a graphical fashion.

6000 BC–present
8000 years – the last 1000 years (fine grid) is expanded in the timeline below

1000AD—present

1750–1900

1900–present

contemporary architecture shouldn't be regarded as a style merely being a term to encompass architectural styles of our period

See also 

 Timeline of architecture
 List of architectural styles

References
Voorthuis – Timelines (archived copy)

External links
Rndrd – a website documenting unbuilt architectural designs representative of the 20th century

+02
Architectural Styles 1750-1900
Architectural styles
Architecture lists
+
+
Design-related lists
Architectural styles